1980–1985 The New Mix in One Go is a compilation of remixed songs by the Swiss band Yello. It was released on March 17, 1986.  The album peaked at No. 99 in Australia on the Kent Music Report chart in December 1986.

Track listing
 "Daily Disco"
 "Swing"
 "The Evening's Young"
 "Pinball Cha Cha"
 "I Love You"
 "Vicious Games"
 "Sometimes (Dr. Hirsch)"
 "Base for Alec"
 "Oh Yeah"
 "Lost Again"
 "Tub Dub"
 "Angel No"
 "Desire"
 "Bananas to the Beat"
 "Koladi-Ola"
 "Domingo"
 "Bostich"
 "Live at the Roxy"

Personnel
Composed by, Arranged by – Boris Blank
Cover – Ernst Gamper
Drums – Beat Ash
Guitar – Chico Hablas
Lyrics by, Vocals – Dieter Meier
Mixed by [Mixing Assistance] – Ian Tregoning, Ursli Weber
Photography by – Anton Corbijn
Producer, Engineer [Engineered by] – Yello

Certifications

References

Yello remix albums
1986 remix albums
Vertigo Records remix albums
Mercury Records remix albums
Barclay (record label) remix albums